Random serial dictatorship, also called random priority, can refer to:

 A general rule for social choice - a variant of the dictatorship mechanism.
 A specific rule for item allocation - see random priority item allocation.